The Neyyar Wildlife Sanctuary in the southern state of Kerala in India is spread over the southeast corner of the Western Ghats, and covers a total area of . Although it was declared as a sanctuary in 1958, not much was done about wildlife conservation, until 1985, when a separate wildlife wing was set up and as a result, conservation efforts have gathered momentum. It is part of the Agasthyamala Biosphere Reserve.

Geography
This is the drainage basin for the Neyyar River and its tributaries - Mullayar and Kallar. The towering peak of Agasthyamalai at an elevation of 1868 meters is a very prominent landmark.

Climate
The mean summer temperature is around 35 degrees Celsius and the winter being around 16 degree Celsius. The average rainfall from the Southwest monsoon between May and July and the Northeast monsoon between October and November, is about 2800 mm. The tourist season here is between the months of November and March.

Flora and fauna
This sanctuary has a substantial natural vegetation cover. The diversity of its flora makes the sanctuary an ideal gene pool preserve. There are 39 species of mammals, including  tiger, leopard, sloth bear, elephant, sambar, barking deer, bonnet macaque, Nilgiri langur and Nilgiri tahr. 176 species of birds, 30 species of reptiles, 17 species of amphibians and 40 species of fishes are reported from the sanctuary.                           

A crocodile farm, set up in 1977 at Neyyar, is home to around 20 mugger crocodiles. The Crocodile Rehabilitation and Research Centre was inaugurated at Neyyar Wildlife Sanctuary in May 2007.

Neyyar Elephant Rehabilitation Centre complex within the area cares for several elephants, from elephant calves to an 87-year-old elephant, and offers elephant rides and elephant feeding.

There is also a deer rehabilitation centre.

Visitor information 
The administrative complex of Neyyar complex Wildlife Sanctuary is about 1 kilometer West of Neyyar Dam outside the sanctuary complex and has an information center, staff quarters, rest house, and a youth hostel. The sanctuary offers facilities for the tourists to visit the lion park and also boat on the Neyyar lake.

Nearest railway station: Neyyattinkara Railway Station, 20 km
Nearest airport: Trivandrum International Airport, 40 km

See also 
 Neyyar Dam
 Crocodile Rehabilitation and Research Centre
 Tourism in Thiruvananthapuram
 Kottur Elephant Sanctuary and Rehabilitation Centre

References

External links

 Neyyar Wildlife Sanctuary by A.J.T. Johnsingh, Wildlife Institute of India

Wildlife sanctuaries in Kerala
Tourist attractions in Thiruvananthapuram district
Protected areas of Kerala
Geography of Thiruvananthapuram district
1958 establishments in Kerala
Protected areas established in 1958